DZIQ (990 AM) was a radio station owned and operated by Trans-Radio Broadcasting Corporation, the radio arm of the Philippine Daily Inquirer. The station's studio is located on the 2nd floor, Media Resources Plaza Building, Mola cor. Pasong Tirad sts., Brgy. La Paz, Makati, while its transmitter is located at Brgy. Panghulo, Obando, Bulacan.

DZIQ had a "teleradyo"-formatted television counterpart INQUIRER 990 Television.

History

In early 2010, The Inquirer Group acquired DWRT-AM and changed its call sign to DZIQ. After a series of test broadcast, it was launched on May 10, 2010 as Radyo Inquirer. Ciro Songco was the first station manager of Radio Inquirer during the early years. The station's format and content were the same as the Philippine Daily Inquirer newspaper and online version. On August 16, 2010, Radyo Inquirer started transmissions on terrestrial radio by switching from an old 10,000-watt transmitter in Sta. Maria, Bulacan (which was used by DWRT-AM then) to its newly acquired 50,000-watt AM transmitter imported from Canada (situated at Obando, Bulacan), and its official launch was on September 9, 2010. As Radyo Inquirer gained listenership, the Inquirer Group subsequently purchased Trans-Radio Broadcasting Corporation, making it the PDI's official broadcast arm.

In 2013, it underwent experimenting with the use of the English language in all of the programs of the station, similar to the current format of DZRJ 810 AM: The Voice of the Philippines. The move was abandoned after about a year.

Revitalization
In May–June 2015, it went into massive programming changes together with the consolidation of Inquirer platforms, after the appointment of former ABS-CBN News veteran Jake Maderazo as Station Manager and Arlyn dela Cruz (who once worked in the foundation of the Net 25 Eagle News Service in 2001 up until her resignation in 2013) as the station's News Manager by the president of TRBC, Paolo Prieto, following the new tagline, "Bayang Nagtatanong, Mamamayang Naguusisa". Tarpaulins signifying the rebirth of Radyo Inquirer was placed in different locations, while the "Balita sa Kalsada" news service showed in the LED walls across Mega Manila from time to time. In July 2015, radyo.INQUIRER.net (part of INQUIRER.net) was launched, its owned news site showcased articles in Tagalog language as reported by Radyo Inquirer reporters and columns from the anchors including Den Macaranas, Ira Panganiban, Brenda Domato, Jake Maderazo and Arlyn Dela Cruz.

Radyo INQUIRER also partnered with the Voice of the Youth, sending their youth volunteers, to beef up the reportorial team that will deliver credible and extensive news coverage, in time for the 2016 elections.

Its programming consists of newscasts airing at 7 am, noon, 5 pm, and 10 pm, hourly news updates and up-to-date news coverage and different programs including public affairs, public service, children's, entertainment, lifestyle, religious, sports, and youth-oriented programs cater to the audience and partnerships with COMELEC, NEDA, GSIS, SSS, Metropolitan Manila Development Authority, MTRCB, Ayala Corporation, Metro Pacific Investments Corporation, San Miguel Corporation, Philhealth and DOST, to name a few.

Radyo Inquirer celebrated its 5th anniversary at the Resorts World Manila on September 9, 2015. In March 2016, Radyo Inquirer launched their smartphone application.

In May 2016, the "TeleRadyo"-formatted videostreaming channel of Radyo Inquirer began its broadcast via BEAM TV's digital subchannel, coinciding with the 2016 Philippine elections. In April 2018, the station gradually phased out the Radyo Inquirer brand after 8 years of usage.

In August 2018, the station launched its first station ID anthem Bayang Nagtatanong, Mamamayang Nag-uusisa. The lyrics of the anthem was composed by the station's news director Arlyn Dela Cruz and performed by the band Por Da Lab.

Radyo Inquirer also got two new slogans namely, "Balanseng Pagbabalita, Walang Takot na Pamamahayag " and "Bayang Nagtatanong, Mamamayang Nag-uusisa!"

DZIQ silently went off the air in 2020 during the community quarantine and after the station's franchise lapsed. The television counterpart followed suit at the end of 2020. The following year, Radyo Inquirer was relaunched as Radyo Inquirer On-Line with some of its programs migrating to digital platforms.

Programming

Notable anchors
Mon Tulfo (currently with DZRJ 810)

Awards and recognition
 Best AM Radio Station (Metro Manila) - 25th KBP Golden Dove Awards (2017)

References

External links

Radyo Inquirer live streaming on USTREAM

Philippine Daily Inquirer
Defunct radio stations in Metro Manila
Radio stations established in 2010
News and talk radio stations in the Philippines
Radio stations disestablished in 2020